Emilse Miranda Munive (born 14 June 1971) is a Mexican politician affiliated with the PRI. She served as a federal deputy of the LXII Legislature of the Mexican Congress representing Hidalgo, and previously served as a local deputy in the LXI Legislature of the Congress of Hidalgo. She was the municipal president of San Bartolo Tutotepec from 2003 to 2006.

References

1971 births
Living people
Politicians from Hidalgo (state)
Women members of the Chamber of Deputies (Mexico)
Institutional Revolutionary Party politicians
21st-century Mexican politicians
21st-century Mexican women politicians
Deputies of the LXII Legislature of Mexico
Members of the Chamber of Deputies (Mexico) for Hidalgo (state)
Universidad Autónoma del Estado de Hidalgo alumni
Members of the Congress of Hidalgo
Municipal presidents in Hidalgo (state)